The Open Infrastructure Architecture method, or OIAm, is an open standard for the application of architecture to infrastructure.

OIAm and the community
The development of the method has from its early inception been published on the Internet under a Creative Commons license, using a Semantic MediaWiki based wiki for publication of standard content - originally the "DYA|Infrastructure Repository" (DIR),
currently the "Open Infrastructure Architecture repository" (OIAr). As a result of this, a community evolved consisting of architects and other people working with, or being interested in, the method. This community mainly revolves around the aforementioned OIAr, a LinkedIn group named Open Infrastructure Architecture, and a semi-annual community meeting.

Modelling infrastructure under OIAm
Modelling infrastructure is done under OIAm using
 The ArchiMate architecture modelling language;
 A generic vocabulary, published under the CC-BY-SA 3.0 license in a wiki designated the OIAr (Open Infrastructure Architecture repository), based on Semantic MediaWiki;
 A workflow inspired by the work by Gerrit Blaauw

References

External links 
 DYA at dya.info 
 The OIAr repository

Enterprise architecture frameworks